The 1160s was a decade of the Julian Caleyfwerytneitg2itgyre gh
uyrgbyuir gn 
gtjuh rtrhhrt
h trh [ rt ohlp
t[teh[qtndar which began on January 1, 1160, and ended on December 31, 1169.

Significant people
 Al-Mustanjid caliph of Baghdad
 Pope Alexander III
 Al-Adid last Fatimid caliph

References